The first season of the American science fiction television series Defiance premiered on Syfy on Monday April 15, 2013 and ended on July 8, 2013 with a total of 12 episodes. The show stars Grant Bowler, Julie Benz, Stephanie Leonidas, Tony Curran, Jaime Murray, Graham Greene and Mia Kirschner.

The series is produced by Universal Cable Productions, in transmedia collaboration with Trion Worlds, who have released an MMORPG video game of the same name which is tied into the series.

Cast

Main cast 
 Grant Bowler as Joshua Nolan
 Julie Benz as Amanda Rosewater
 Stephanie Leonidas as Irisa Nyira
 Tony Curran as Datak Tarr
 Jaime Murray as Stahma Tarr
 Graham Greene as Rafe McCawley
 Mia Kirshner as Kenya Rosewater

Recurring cast 
 Trenna Keating as Doc Yewll
Dewshane Williams as Tommy LaSalle
 Jesse Rath as Alak Tarr
Justin Rain as Quentin McCawley
 Nicole Muñoz as Christie McCawley
 Fionnula Flanagan as Nicolette "Nicky" Riordon
 Brittany Allen as Tirra
 Gale Harold as Connor Lang

Guest stars
 Robin Dunne as Miko
 Brian J. Smith as Gordon McClintock

Episodes

Home media 

Note

References

External links 

2013 American television seasons
Defiance (TV series)